Von Geldern is surname, borne by many of the relatives of the German poet Heinrich Heine.

People bearing the name include:

 Simon von Geldern (1720–1774), German traveler and author
 Gustav Heine, Freiherr von Geldern (1812–1886), German-Austrian publicist
 Robert Baron (Freiherr) von Heine-Geldern (1885–1968), Austrian scholar
 Wolfgang von Geldern (born 1944), German politician (CDU)

See also 
 List of European Jewish nobility
 Heine
 Geldern 

Jewish-German families
German noble families
Heinrich Heine

de:Geldern (Begriffsklärung)